HMS Saldanha was a 36-gun Apollo-class frigate of the British Royal Navy, launched in 1809 and wrecked on the coast of Ireland in 1811. Before she was wrecked she participated in the capture of a noted French privateer.

Service
Saldanha was first commissioned in April 1810 under Captain John Stuart, who died on 19 March 1811. Captain William Pakenham then was assigned to command her, though in the Spring, Saldanha was temporarily under the command of Captain Reuben Mangin.

On 11 October 1811,  and Saldanha, under Pakenham, took the French privateer Vice-Amiral Martin. The privateer carried 18 guns and a crew of 140 men. On this cruise Vice-Amiral Martin was four days out of Bayonne and had not taken anything. Captain H. Vansitart of Fortunee remarked that Vice-Amiral Martin had superior sailing abilities that in the past had helped her escape British cruisers, and that though this time each of the British vessels was doing , she would have escaped if the British had not had two vessels.

Loss
Saldanha and the sloop-of-war  were based together in Lough Swilly, Donegal when on 30 November they set out on a cruise to the west. Saldanha shipwrecked in a gale on the night of 4 December 1811 in the Lough while possibly attempting to return to her anchorage. There were no survivors out of the estimated 253 aboard, and some 200 bodies washed up on the shore at Ballymastocker Bay on the west side of the Lough. (Actually, one man did make it to the shore alive but he died almost immediately thereafter.) Initial reports suggested that Talbot too had been wrecked but as it turned out these reports were mistaken. In August a servant at a house some 20 miles from the wreck site shot a bird that turned out to be a parrot with a collar engraved with "Captain Packenham of His Majesty's Ship Saldanha".

Postscript
On 4 December 2011 a special ceremony was held to mark the 200th anniversary of sinking in Lough Swilly of HMS Saldanha. It was the first commemorative event recalling what is one of Ireland's worst ever marine disasters. Until then there had been no permanent memorial to their deaths.

Notes, citations, and references
Notes

Citations

References
 
 
 Long, W.H. (1899) Naval yarns : letters and anecdotes, comprising accounts of sea fights and wrecks, actions with pirates and privateers from 1616 to 1831, pp. 257–63.
 

1809 ships
Ships built by Temple shipbuilders
Maritime incidents in 1811
Shipwrecks of Ireland
Apollo-class frigates